The 1909 Yukon general election was held on 28 June 1909 to elect the ten members of the Yukon Territorial Council. The council was non-partisan and had merely an advisory role to the federally appointed Commissioner. The 1909 election marked the first time that voters in the territory elected the entire council — in the four prior elections, the council was composed of five elected representatives and five representatives appointed by the Canadian federal government.

The election was held using five two-member districts, where voters could cast two votes each.

Members elected

References

Elections in Yukon
1909 elections in Canada
1909 in Yukon
June 1909 events